David Slater (born November 22, 1962) is an American singer and songwriter.

Career
Slater was the male vocalist champion on TV's Star Search in 1987. Slater then signed a recording contract with Capitol Records and launched a country music career. He released two albums on Capitol in the late 1980s, Exchange of Hearts and Be with Me. Both albums were produced by Randy Scruggs. Several of Slater's radio singles including "I'm Still Your Fool" and "The Other Guy" reached the top 40 on Billboard and other charts. Notable backup singers on Slater's Capitol albums include Vince Gill and members of Australian rock band, Little River Band.

In addition to his own music, David performs classic standards made famous by legendary artists such as Frank Sinatra, Dean Martin, Ella Fitzgerald, and Nat King Cole. His 2012 album, "As Time Goes By," is a jazzy tribute to the singers and songwriters who made the 'Great American Songbook' so legendary.

David's 2021 album, "Hello, Young Lovers," is a stirring collection of 16 great love songs from classic Broadway and movie musicals, all updated with fresh, crisp jazz arrangements. Says Slater, "The 'Young Lovers' album is my favorite - it's the result of incredible work by the arranger, Diane Marino, and the outstanding musicians who hit it out of the park on every song."

Slater is preparing to release a Christmas album in 2024 entitled "The Secret of Christmas."

Discography

Albums

Singles

References
 

American male singer-songwriters
American country singer-songwriters
Living people
1962 births